The 7th IAAF World Cup in Athletics was an international track and field sporting event sponsored by the International Association of Athletics Federations, held on September 9–11, 1994, at the Crystal Palace National Sports Centre in London, England.

Overall results

Results summary

Men

Women

References

External links
World Cup Results
Full Results by IAAF

IAAF Continental Cup
World Cup
IAAF World Cup
World Cup
September 1994 sports events in the United Kingdom
International sports competitions in London
International athletics competitions hosted by England